Stenodexia is a genus of parasitic flies in the family Tachinidae.

Species
Stenodexia albicincta Wulp, 1891
Stenodexia foxii Johnson, 1919

References

Diptera of North America
Dexiinae
Tachinidae genera
Taxa named by Frederik Maurits van der Wulp